The Texas Valley League was a minor league baseball league that played in three different periods. The league was an Independent league from 1901 to 1908 and a Class D level league from 1927 to 1928 and in 1938. In every season of play, the Texas Valley League consisted of teams based in Texas.

History
The Texas Valley League began play as an Independent league in the 1901 season and played continuously through 1908. The exact records and teams in the seasons from 1901 to 1908 are unknown.

In 1927, the Texas Valley League reformed and began play as a four–team Class D level league, evolving from the 1926 Gulf Coast League. The 1927 Texas Valley League members were the Corpus Christi Seahawks, Edinburg Bobcats, Laredo Oilers and Mission Grapefruiters. All four teams had played the previous season as the only members of the 1926 Gulf Coast League. The Texas Valley League began play on April 5, 1927, with the Corpus Christi Seahawks winning the first–half standings. Laredo won the second–half standings. Mission had the best overall record. In the Final, Corpus Christi Swept Laredo in three games.

The Texas Valley League continued play as a four–team league in 1928 before folding. The Corpus Christi Seahawks and Mission Grapefruits were joined by teams from Brownsville, Texas and McAllen, Texas in the Class D level league, as Edinburg and Laredo had folded. The 1928 season standings are unknown. The league folded after the 1928 season.

The Texas Valley League formed for a final season in 1938, playing as a six–team Class D level league. The Brownsville Charros, Corpus Christi Spudders, Harlingen Hubs, McAllen Packers, Refugio Oilers and Taft Cardinals made up the 1938 league franchises. The league president was Guy Airey. Corpus Christi won the regular season pennant with a 92–44 record, finishing 8.5 games ahead of 2nd place Harlingen. In the first round of the playoffs, the Harlingen Hubs defeated the Taft Cardinals 3 games to 0 and the Corpus Christi Spudders defeated the Refugio Oilers 3 games to 2. In the Finals, the Harlingen Hubs won the championship, defeating Corpus Christi in a four–game sweep. The Texas Valley League permanently folded after the 1938 season.

Cities represented
Brownsville, Texas: Brownsville (1928); Brownsville Charros (1938) 
Corpus Christi, Texas: Corpus Christi Seahawks (1927–1928); Corpus Christi Spudders (1938)
Edinburg, Texas: Edinburg Bobcats (1927) 
Harlingen, Texas: Harlingen Hubs (1938)
Laredo, Texas: Laredo Oilers (1927)
McAllen, Texas: McAllen (1928), McAllen Packers (1938) 
Mission, Texas: Mission Grapefruiters (1927–1928) 
Refugio, Texas: Refugio Oilers (1938)
Taft, Texas: Taft Cardinals (1938)

Standings & statistics

1901 to 1908 Texas Valley League
The standings in the 1901 to 1908 seasons are unknown.

1927 Texas Valley League
Playoff: Corpus Christi 3 games, Laredo 0. Corpus Christi won the first half standings. Laredo won the second half standings.

1928 Texas Valley League
The 1928 Texas Valley League standings are unknown.

1938 Texas Valley League
 Playoffs: Harlingen Hubs 3 games, Taft Cardinals 0; Corpus Christi Spudders 3 games, Refugio Oilers 2. Finals: Harlingen Hubs 4 games Corpus Christi Spudders 0.

References

External links
Baseball Reference

Defunct minor baseball leagues in the United States
Baseball leagues in Texas
Defunct professional sports leagues in the United States
Sports leagues established in 1901
Sports leagues disestablished in 1938
1901 establishments in Texas
1938 disestablishments in Texas